W3 or W-3 may refer to:

 W3 (tram), a class of electric trams built by the Melbourne & Metropolitan Tramways Board
 W3, a postcode district in the W postcode area
 Apple W3, a wireless chip used in the Apple Watch Series 4.
 PZL W-3 Sokół, a Polish helicopter
 The Amazing 3, a manga and anime series, known in Japan as Wonder 3
 Arik Air, which has IATA code W3 
 The fourth step of the W0-W6 scale for the classification of meteorites by weathering
 The U.S. Internal Revenue Service form W-3, a transmittal form for Form W-2 information
 Webster's Third New International Dictionary, the 1961 edition of Webster's Dictionary
 The World Wide Web, abbreviated 'W3' on the earliest web pages
 World Wide Web Consortium, international standards organization for the World Wide Web (abbreviated WWW or W3)
 Windows 3.0, a Microsoft operating system

Video games
 Warcraft III: Reign of Chaos, the third game in the Warcraft series.
 Worms & Reinforcements United, a game bundle composing the first Worms game and the Worms Reinforcements expansion pack

See also

WWW (disambiguation)
3W (disambiguation)
3 (disambiguation)
W (disambiguation)
 Web development tools